Teufel im Fleisch ("Devil in the flesh" in German) is a 1964 West German film directed by Hermann Wallbrück.

Plot 
As young people dance the twist carefree, a voice-over warns of impending sexually-transmitted diseases. Doctors Alexander, Esters and Jensen leave Trieste by boat for Africa to search for the causes there. In a flashback, we learn that Dr. Alexander and Dr. Esters met through treatment for syphilis. Dr. Alexander and Dr. Jensen, in turn, saved the beautiful Jenny from being attacked by Soviet soldiers at the end of the war. Since then, they have worked together with Jenny as an assistant. When a squad of soldiers storms the clinic, they attack Jenny.

Back in the present, the ship's doctor, Dr. Beuron heads to his apprenticeship in Marseille. There he is beaten by pimps before the police arrest the prostitutes. The next day, there is discovered to be a stowaway. She also tells her story in a flashback. Upon reaching East Africa, the researchers visit a clinic there. A local colleague explains that the white man brought a nasty disease. They find traces of prostitution everywhere before flying back home. There, Dr. Alexander gives a lecture with photos of syphilis patients. Dr. Esters complements the lecture with her report, visible as a flashback, about a sick person who has gone insane. Finally, Dr. Jensen provides insight into the current state of savagery among the youth.

Cast 
 Aleksandar Gavrić as Dr. Alexander
 Ruth Gassmann as Dr. Esters
 Peter Heim as Dr. Jensen
 Dunja Rajter as Jenny
 Ingrid Boyer as Stowaway
 Maria Rohm as Prostitute
 Manrik Schumacher as Dr. Beuron

Production 
Location shooting took place in Addis Ababa, Massawa, Asmara, Venice, Geneva, Munich, Vienna, and Hamburg. The film, which was shot in 1963, had its world premiere on January 7, 1964, at the Royal Cinema in Munich.

Reception 
Author Rolf Thissen regarded Teufel im Fleisch as a traditional "old" sex education film, which "on the one hand speculates on the viewer's fear of the undesirable consequences of lust and on the other hand encourages them by showing something that otherwise would not have been tolerated in the cinema" in contrast to the "new" educational films that appeared a few years later.

Criticism of the film mainly focused on how the film's synopsis mostly consists of flashbacks. Süddeutsche Zeitung of January 10, 1964 wrote: "The film calls itself a 'documentary', but is really just an unusually poorly staged 'illustrated film.'"

The Münchner Merkur of January 9, 1964 summed it up: "But the fact that such a 'devil in the flesh' can be expelled by creating fatigue is probably the only novel aspect of this film".

Filmdienst commented: "A speculative, quickly-shot film with no relevance and no effective educational effect".

References

Bibliography

External links 
 

West German films
1960s German-language films
1960s German films
Films about prostitution